Diary of a Wimpy Kid: The Long Haul is a children's novel written by Jeff Kinney and is the ninth book in the Diary of a Wimpy Kid series. On April 28, 2014, Kinney announced the book's name and the color of its cover. The book was released on November 4, 2014, in the USA. It received generally positive reviews from critics.

Plot
As Greg Heffley's summer vacation starts, his mother announces that the family will be going on a surprise road trip. As they pack their suitcases for the trip, Greg's father brings his old boat, towing it behind the van as so to fit luggage.

After a day of driving, including some road trip games and a Spanish lesson, the Heffleys stop at a run-down motel. Greg and his brother Rodrick visit the hot tub, which is already in use by another family. Later on, Greg's sleep is disturbed by a group of kids riding on a cleaning cart, whom he recognizes from the hot tub. He yells at them, is intimidated by their father, and then quickly returns to his room. The next day, the Heffleys visit a county fair. While driving, Greg notices the family from the motel in a purple van and nicknames them "the Beardos" after their father's notable beard. At the fair, Greg's little brother, Manny, wins a live baby pig in a contest. The pig stays in the back of the van with Greg.

At a hotel the next night, the pig eats and drinks food from the minibar in Greg and Rodrick's room, costing them money. Greg's father has to take a business call during the drive and needs everyone to be silent. After a chain of disastrous events, including the pig biting Greg's finger, Greg's parents willingly donate it to a petting zoo, which upsets Manny. After Greg is taken to a veterinarian for treatment for the pig bite, the family stops at another hotel much more decent than the first.

In the morning, Greg's mother takes the family to the beach for the day. As Rodrick drives the van on the bridge, Greg feeds a seagull one of his snacks, causing a flock of them to fly into the car. Panicking, Rodrick accidentally presses the gas pedal and ends up hitting the car in front of them. They learn from a mechanic that their minivan will take hours to fix, and go to a nearby water park to spend time.

Greg's parents put their wallets and cell phones in a locker. After Greg is pranked by Rodrick and has a misunderstanding at a raft ride, he goes back to their chair, finding that it has been taken by the Beardos. Greg chooses not to confront them and goes back to his family at the snack bar. As they prepare to leave, they realize they have lost their locker's key. After a failed search, Greg remembers the locker number, '929', and asks an employee to unlock it. The Heffleys find that the locker is empty, and Greg assumes that their belongings must have been stolen by whoever found the key. Greg tells his family about the Beardos and tries searching back at their beach chair, but notices that the Beardos are driving away.

The Heffleys get their car back from the mechanic, but since Greg's parents have left their wallets in the locker, they are unable to pay him. He advises them to turn the heater on to prevent the radiator from breaking. As they get closer to their house, they notice the Beardos' van outside a motel. Greg sees the family leave their room, forgetting to lock the door. The Heffleys charge in to find their belongings, but get distracted instead and utilize the Beardos' items for themselves. As Greg's father is using the bathroom, the Beardos return. He distracts them long enough to get away from the hotel. However, since the car's heater is not on, it breaks down and one of the tires goes flat.

Greg notices a purple van approaching, and the drivers are two Spanish-speaking men trying to help. Manny speaks perfect Spanish, having learned from a Spanish CD played during a car ride, and convinces them to drive his family to the petting zoo, where he and the pig reunite.

At home, Greg has to adjust to living with the pig, his parents get new credit cards and cell phones, and the boat is given to the Spanish men for their help. While unpacking, Greg finds the key from the water park in his shorts, with the number "292." He realizes he had mistakenly claimed the locker number was "929." Greg is not sure what to do and does not want to get in trouble with his parents, writing, "it's hard to see this story having a happy ending."
⠀⠀⠀⠀

Reception
Common Sense Media gave the book four out of five stars.

Film adaptation

A film adaptation of the book, starring Jason Drucker replacing Zachary Gordon as Greg Heffley, was released on May 19, 2017.

References

External links
Diary of a Wimpy Kid: The Long Haul on the series' official website.

The Long Haul
2014 American novels
American novels adapted into films
Novels by Jeff Kinney
2014 children's books
Amulet Books books
Puffin Books books